"2013 World Tour" may refer to:
In sports
The 2013 ATP World Tour, a men's tennis circuit
The 2013 UCI World Tour, a road cycling event
The 2013 GSS World Tour, a bodyboarding competition